42 may refer to: 
 42 (number)
 The years 42 BC and AD 42

Arts, entertainment, and media
 42 (dominoes), a game
 42 (film), a 2013 biopic about American baseball player Jackie Robinson
 42, a 2021 album by Sech
 42, the Answer to the Ultimate Question of Life, the Universe, and Everything, from Douglas Adams' series The Hitchhiker's Guide to the Galaxy. Named after or in honor of this:
 "42"  (Doctor Who), a 2007 television episode 
 "42" (2001), the final episode of the television series Buzz Lightyear of Star Command
 "42" (song), a 2008 song by Coldplay
 42, the 2012 debut album of Cthulhu Rise
 42 Entertainment, an alternate reality games company founded in 2003
 "42", a song by Mumford & Sons from Delta, 2018
 "Forty Two", a song by Karma to Burn from the album Appalachian Incantation, 2010

Other uses
 42 (school), a French computer programming school
 The 42 (Kolkata), a residential skyscraper in India
 Tower 42 a skyscraper in London, England
 42.zip, a zip bomb
 42, Jackie Robinson’s jersey number, since retired
 42, the atomic number of Molybdenum

See also
 42V, a former project to convert motor vehicle electrical power to 42 volts